Russell William "Rusty" Wallace Jr. (born August 14, 1956) is an American former NASCAR racing driver. He won the 1984 NASCAR Cup series Rookie of the Year and the 1989 NASCAR Winston Cup Championship. Over the course of his successful career, Wallace has been inducted in the NASCAR Hall of Fame (2013), the International Motorsports Hall of Fame (2013), the Motorsports Hall of Fame of America (2014) and the National Motorsports Press Association Hall of Fame (2010).

Racing career

Early career
Prior to joining the NASCAR circuit, Wallace made a name for himself racing around in Florida, winning a pair of local track championships and more than 200 short track races. In 1979, he won the United States Auto Club's (USAC) Stock Car Rookie of the Year honors, finishing third in points behind A. J. Foyt and Bay Darnell. In 1981, he finished second in the USAC Stock Cars championship standings, behind Joe Ruttman.

In 1983, he won the American Speed Association (ASA) championship while competing against some of NASCAR's future stars like Mark Martin, Alan Kulwicki, and Dick Trickle.

NASCAR career

In 1980, Wallace made his NASCAR debut at Atlanta, driving the No. 16 Chevrolet for Roger Penske. He ended up finishing second in the race after qualifying seventh. He made nine NASCAR appearances over the next three years, finishing inside the Top 10 in only one more race. In 1984, Wallace joined the Winston Cup circuit full-time, winning NASCAR Rookie of the Year honors and finishing 14th in the final points standings. He drove the No. 88 Gatorade-sponsored Pontiac for Cliff Stewart with a best finish of fourth, along with two fifth-place finishes and four further Top 10s. Wallace stayed with Cliff Stewart for 1985 but this time, he drove the No. 2 Alugard-sponsored Pontiac. In 29 races, Wallace had two Top 5s and eight Top 10s.

Blue Max Racing
In 1986, Wallace switched teams to the No. 27 Alugard-sponsored Pontiac for Raymond Beadle's Blue Max Racing team. His first win came at Bristol Motor Speedway on April 6, 1986. He also won at Martinsville on September 21. He finished the year with two wins, four Top 5s, and 16 Top 10s in 29 races. He finished sixth in the points, making this his first Top 10 finish in the standings. In 1987, Wallace gained sponsorship from Kodiak tobacco, establishing the No. 27 Kodiak-sponsored Pontiac livery his early career is most remembered for. He scored victories at Watkins Glen and Riverside, as well as his first series pole at Michigan in June. These results were backed up with nine Top 5s and 16 Top 10s in 29 races. He finished fifth in the final points standings.

During a practice session at Bristol on August 27, 1988, Wallace's car lost control and slammed on the turn 4 wall before barrel rolling five times on the straightaway. It took rescue officials - including Dr. Jerry Punch - 15 minutes to extract him from the wrecked car. According to Wallace, he nearly choked to death from a ham sandwich he ate before practice. Despite this near-death experience, Wallace developed his career further in 1988, scoring six victories (including four of the final five races of the year). His wins were at Michigan, Charlotte, North Wilkesboro, Rockingham, the final race ever run at Riverside, and the season finale at Atlanta. With these six wins as well as 19 Top 5s and four further Top 10s, he finished second to Bill Elliott by 24 points.

In 1989, Wallace won the NASCAR Winston Cup Championship with crew chief Barry Dodson, by finishing 15th at the Atlanta Journal 500 at Atlanta to beat out close friend and fierce rival Dale Earnhardt (the race winner) by 12 points. Wallace also won The Winston in a controversial fashion, by spinning out Darrell Waltrip on the last lap.

In 1990, Raymond Beadle switched sponsors, to Miller Genuine Draft. The four-year sponsorship deal was tied specifically to Wallace, meaning it went to whichever team Wallace went. The 1989 championship year was reportedly marked with acrimony between him and Beadle. However, Wallace was stuck with the team for 1990 due to his contract. Rusty won 18 races for Beadle.

Penske Racing
In 1991, Wallace took the Miller sponsorship with him to Penske Racing, and he continued in the No. 2 Miller Genuine Draft-sponsored Pontiac. He also won the 1991 IROC championship. While 1992 only carried him one win, the win at the Miller 400 was satisfying;  it was the first win for Wallace in a car which arguably was his best known chassis for his career, one affectionately known as "Midnight" after the win.  With this nickname, the car raced for six seasons, carrying various race wins before being taken out of the fleet in 1997.

The 1993 season was arguably his most successful season despite two major accidents at Daytona and Talladega, in which his car went airborne and flipped several times. He won the second race of the season on February 28, 1993, at North Carolina Motor Speedway. The season was also a sad one, as Wallace's friend and reigning NASCAR Champion Alan Kulwicki was killed flying into Bristol in April 1993. Because of this, when Wallace won the race at Bristol, in respect to Alan Kulwicki, he did a "Polish victory lap"—turning his car around and driving around the track the wrong way, as made famous by Kulwicki. In every race Wallace won that year he performed a "Kulwicki victory lap". He won all three races in April (Bristol on April 4, North Wilkesboro on April 18, and Martinsville on April 25). Also, he won the first ever race at the New Hampshire Speedway, starting 33rd, on July 11.
In 1993, he won 10 of the 30 races, but finished second in the final points standings, 80 points behind Earnhardt. He ended the season strong, finishing in the Top 3 in all but two of the final 10 races of the season.

Penske switched to Fords in 1994. In 1996, sponsorship changed from Miller Genuine Draft to Miller beer sponsorship.

In 1997, Miller changed the team's sponsorship to Miller Lite, replacing the black and gold with a blue and white scheme. In 1998, Wallace won the Bud Shootout at Daytona, a non-points race for the previous years pole winners and past winners of the race. It was the first win for Ford's new Taurus, and Wallace's only victory at NASCAR's premier track (as well as his only victory in any restrictor plate race) in a Cup car.

In 2000, he secured his 50th career win at Bristol, becoming the 10th driver in NASCAR to win 50+ races. He is also the only driver in NASCAR history to win his 1st and 50th career victories at the same track, and in the same race. He would also score 3 more wins at Pocono, Michigan, and the night race at Bristol (season sweep at Bristol). He finished seventh in the final points standings after some inconsistency in the championship race. The next year, he won at California for his 54th career win. He won on what would have been Dale Earnhardt's 50th birthday and paid tribute to him with an Earnhardt flag. Wallace almost won the 2002 Sharpie 500 after being bumped out of the way by his rival Jeff Gordon.

In 2003, Penske Racing switched to Dodge and appropriately, in 2004, Wallace won his 55th (and final) race on a short track: the 2004 spring Martinsville Speedway race. It was also the last win for the track under the ownership of the H. Clay Earles Trust; the death of Mary Weatherford (matriarch of the trust) forced the Trust to sell the track a month later.

On August 30, 2004, Wallace announced that the 2005 NASCAR NEXTEL Cup season would be his last as a full-time driver. Although at the time the possibility remained that he may have continued to run a limited schedule after the 2005 season—as semi-retirees Bill Elliott and Terry Labonte also have done, Wallace's current broadcasting contract forbids him from doing so. Kurt Busch would replace Wallace in the number 2 Miller Lite-sponsored Dodge in 2006–2010. In 2011, Brad Keselowski began driving the number 2.

In 2006, Wallace returned to his General Motors roots when he raced a Crawford-Pontiac sportscar, painted black and carrying the familiar stylized No. 2. The car was sponsored by Callaway Golf, in the Rolex 24 at Daytona, teamed with Danica Patrick and Allan McNish, In 2008, his Nationwide Series cars switched from Dodge to Chevrolet.

Rusty Wallace finished his career with the 1989 Winston Cup Championship, 36 career poles, and 55 career wins. As of 2022, the 55 wins is 11th on NASCAR's all-time wins list. They include victories at Charlotte as well as the series' last three road courses (Riverside, Infineon and Watkins Glen), but none at Daytona, Darlington, Indianapolis or Talladega. He has the most short track wins in NASCAR history with 34, and therefore he is considered among the best short track drivers in NASCAR history. He retired after the 2005 season with a 14.4 career average finish.

In 2014, Wallace ran at Daytona for testing before the 2014 Daytona 500 as part of a promotion for Miller Lite's 40th anniversary, marking the first time a NASCAR Hall of Famer has driven in a NASCAR test. When asked about the testing, Wallace stated, "It all started at Homestead. I was standing between the 48 (Jimmie Johnson) and 2 (Brad Keselowski) cars joking around and those guys were egging me on to get back in a car and when Brad got wind of it, he called me up two weeks later and was serious about it and Roger (Penske) was all for it. Everyone in the world has been on me to test. ‘Why haven’t you been back in a car?’ This here kind of got me."

Major crashes
Wallace's legacy, besides being a close rival of Dale Earnhardt, was a number of severe wrecks he endured, especially at restrictor plate racetracks. The first one happened in 1983, when Wallace was attempting the Daytona 500 through the Gatorade Twin 125's. He was tapped by Rick Wilson, got airborne, and went on a spectacular series of flips that left him hospitalized. His next flip came at Bristol Motor Speedway in 1988. What started it was unclear, but Wallace somehow managed to climb the wall and did a barrel roll. The roof of his car caved in. ESPN commentator Dr. Jerry Punch was the first responder, and possibly saved his life.  In 1993, Wallace had two massive flips – both at plate tracks. The first was at the 1993 Daytona 500, where he was tapped by the crashing cars of Michael Waltrip and Derrike Cope, and barrel rolled multiple times in the grass on the back straightaway several feet in the air.  Months later, at Talladega, racing to the checkered flag, Wallace was tagged from behind by Dale Earnhardt, turned backwards, and flew into the air before violently flipping in the grass past the start-finish line, breaking a wrist (the area where Wallace's car wrecked has since been paved over). Earnhardt was visibly shaken by the incident and did make sure Wallace was okay by checking on him after the race had concluded. Wallace finished 80 points behind Earnhardt in the final points for 1993. He also had an airborne crash in his last Gatorade Twin in 2005 when Dave Blaney clipped his right rear tire and sent his car off the ground. The car never turned over though.

Other racing
On April 1, 2015, Wallace tested a Stadium Super Truck owned by former NASCAR driver Robby Gordon, and the following day, he announced he would race in the series' X Games round in Austin. After finishing last in his heat race, he was relegated to the last-chance qualifier. During the LCQ, Wallace rolled his truck, but continued running; he finished sixth in the event but failed to qualify for the feature.

In 2016, Wallace competed in the Ferrari Finali Mondiali at Daytona. Driving for "Ferrari of Houston", Wallace finished tenth overall and third in the Professional, North America class.

Broadcast career

On January 25, 2006, it was announced that Wallace would cover auto racing events for ESPN and ABC. Despite Wallace's lack of open-wheel racing experience, his assignments began with the IndyCar Series and included the Indianapolis 500 (in a perhaps forgivable lapse, he described a thrilling battle on the last lap as "The most exciting Daytona 500 ever!"). He joined the NASCAR broadcasting team for both networks when they started coverage of the sport in 2007. He signed a six-year deal with ESPN in 2006. He returned to commentate for the 2007 Indianapolis 500 won by Dario Franchitti. He co-hosted NASCAR Angels with Shannon Wiseman. Wallace worked with ESPN from 2007–2014 until their contract with NASCAR expired.

Since the 2015 Daytona 500, Wallace has worked with Motor Racing Network as a booth announcer.

Car owner

Up until 2012, Wallace owned and operated Rusty Wallace Racing, which fielded the No. 62 Pilot Flying J Toyota Camry driven by Michael Annett and the No. 66 5 Hour Energy Toyota Camry driven by his son Steve Wallace. This operation was temporarily suspended due to the loss of sponsorship. However, Steve Wallace confirmed on his Twitter account that the team would return for the Nationwide Series race at Richmond in May 2012 in a former Roush Fenway Racing Ford Mustang, powered by a Roush-Yates engine in the No. 4 sponsored by LoanMax Title Loans. Due to lack of sponsorship in 2013, Wallace's team ran one race in a No. 66 entry finishing 25th at Charlotte, then closed at the conclusion of the season.

Family
Wallace's brothers, Kenny and Mike, also used to race on the NASCAR circuit. He and his wife Patti have three children — Greg, Katie, and Stephen. Stephen raced full-time in the NASCAR Xfinity Series and made his Cup Series debut during the 2011 Daytona 500, making him the fourth member of his family to compete in the Daytona 500 and in NASCAR, behind the Bodines (Geoff, Brett, and Todd), Pettys (Lee, Richard, and Kyle), Earnhardts (Ralph, Dale, Dale Jr. and Jeffrey), and the Allisons (Bobby, Donnie, and Davey). Wallace's father, Russell Wallace Sr., died on October 30, 2011, at age 77.

Iowa Speedway
In late 2005, Wallace broke ground on his "Signature Design Speedway" in Newton, Iowa. Iowa Speedway had its first race on September 15, 2006, and hosted many races in 2007 including an IndyCar race.  The track is noted for its structural similarity to Richmond International Raceway, where Wallace has won six times. Iowa Speedway hosted its first NASCAR Nationwide Series race in 2009.

Endorsements
2003 – Callaway Golf – Callaway Golf Signs NASCAR Driver Rusty Wallace to Multiyear Endorsement and Licensing Agreement.
2009 – U.S. Fidelis – USfidelis TV Campaign Debuts, Featuring NASCAR's Steve and Rusty Wallace. The March 2010 bankruptcy of US Fidelis lists Rusty Wallace Racing as a creditor owed $535,439.
2009 – Lista International Corporation – Legendary NASCAR Driver Rusty Wallace Endorses Lista Products in New Online Video

Other media
Wallace made a cameo appearance in the movie Days of Thunder. He and his brothers all appeared in the Electronic Arts video game NASCAR Rumble. Mike was featured as a Craftsman Truck Series driver, driving the No. 2 ASE Dodge (no specific car makes for the Trucks;  the real truck was a Dodge at the time), Kenny was featured in the game driving the No. 55 Square D Chevrolet (although the game's commercial showed him driving the No. 81 Square D Ford) & Rusty was featured in the game driving his No. 2 Ford, with the exception that the Miller Lite stickers are replaced by Penske Racing stickers similar to current Penske Championship Racing driver Brad Keselowski, whose sponsor is censored by NASCAR's ban on wireless telephone advertising. In the video for “Nowadays” by Lil Skies featuring Landon Cube, Cube can be seen wearing a vintage Rusty Wallace jacket.

Career achievements

Awards and honors
 1988, 1993 Richard Petty Driver of the Year
 2005 NASCAR Illustrated Person of the Year Award recipient
 2005 Myers Brothers Award recipient
 2014 Inducted into the Motorsports Hall of Fame of America

Records and milestones
With 55 career points-paying victories, Wallace is ranked eleventh among the all-time NASCAR Cup Series winners; he is ranked seventh (in a tie with Bobby Allison) among those who have competed during the sport's modern era (1972–present).

Motorsports career results

NASCAR
(key) (Bold – Pole position awarded by qualifying time. Italics – Pole position earned by points standings or practice time. * – Most laps led.)

Nextel Cup Series

Daytona 500

Busch Series

Craftsman Truck Series

International Race of Champions
(key) (Bold – Pole position. * – Most laps led.)

References

External links

 
 
 
 
 Rusty Wallace at NASCAR.com
 Rusty Wallace at ESPN
 June 2005 interview with Rusty Wallace
 Rusty Wallace Fans Club

Living people
1956 births
People from Arnold, Missouri
Racing drivers from Missouri
Racing drivers from St. Louis
NASCAR drivers
NASCAR Cup Series champions
USAC Stock Car drivers
American Speed Association drivers
International Race of Champions drivers
Stadium Super Trucks drivers
X Games athletes
NASCAR team owners
Motorsport announcers
Wallace family
American radio sports announcers
American television sports announcers
ESPN people
Team Penske drivers
ARCA Midwest Tour drivers
NASCAR Hall of Fame inductees
Ferrari Challenge drivers